Avrohom Gurwicz is an English-born Orthodox rabbi and Talmudic scholar. Since 1982 he has been the rosh yeshivah of Gateshead Talmudical College, a yeshiva in Gateshead, England, where he has been giving the largest shiur (Torah lecture) in Europe with approximately 250 students attending, for approximately half a century.

Biography
Rabbi Gurwicz is the second son of Rabbi Leib Gurwicz, the previous Gateshead rosh yeshivah. He is the grandson of Rabbi Elyah Lopian and son-in-law of Reb Elyah's son, Rabbi Leib Lopian. Through his father's mother, he is a descendant of the Vilna Gaon.

Rabbi Gurwicz married the daughter of his uncle, Rabbi Leib Lopian, and his wife, Tzipa. He is a brother-in-law (through his sister Sarah) and cousin to Rabbi Zvi Kushelevsky, head of the Heichal Hatorah beTzion yeshiva in Jerusalem. Among his sons-in-law is Rabbi Nissan Kaplan, a former maggid shiur in the Mir yeshiva in Jerusalem.

Works 
Anfei Erez, 4 volumes on various sugyas (topics) in Shas.
Ve'anafeha Arzei El on the Torah and Jewish holidays; he has also published for his students his lectures in note form on various tractates (Leket Ha'aros).
 Leket Hearos, notes from the shiurim he has given.

References

English Orthodox rabbis
British people of Polish-Jewish descent
British people of Lithuanian-Jewish descent
Living people
Year of birth missing (living people)